Diego Ruiz may refer to:

 Diego Ruiz (skier) (born 1977), Spanish cross-country skier
 Diego Ruiz (footballer) (born 1980), Argentine footballer
 Diego Ruiz (runner) (born 1982), Spanish middle-distance runner
 Diego Ruiz de Montoya (1562–1632), Spanish Jesuit theologian
 Quas (video gamer) or Diego Ruiz